The Second International Congress on World Evangelization, often called Lausanne II or Lausanne '89, was held in Manila.

The conference is noted for producing the Manila Manifesto, a renewed and expanded commitment to the Lausanne Covenant, an influential document in modern Evangelical Christianity.

It was also here that the Christian mission strategist Luis Bush first highlighted the need for a major focus of evangelism in the "Resistant Belt", covering the middle of the eastern hemisphere. Further research in mid-1990 led to the 10/40 Window concept, which contrasts the major needs and few resources devoted to this part of the world.

The congress was a very influential world conference of over 4,000 Evangelical Christian leaders that was held in Manila, the Philippines, in 1989 to discuss the progress, resources, and methods of evangelizing the world.

The First International Congress on World Evangelization was held in 1974. Notably, it produced the Lausanne Covenant.

External links
The Lausanne Committee on Lausanne II
Manifesto
Manila 1989 documents

Evangelical Christian missions
International Congress on World Evangelization
1989 in the Philippines
1989 in Christianity
Evangelicalism in the Philippines
Evangelism
1989 conferences

zh:洛桑世界宣教大會#第二屆世界福音宣教大會